Steve Buckhantz (born June 19, 1955) is a television play-by-play announcer, most recently for the Washington Wizards.

Biography
Buckhantz began his television announcing career as Sports Director at WTTG, the Fox-owned station in Washington, D.C. as well as NFL games for Fox. A District native, he grew up in Arlington, Virginia, where his father owned a construction company. He attended James Madison University in Harrisonburg, Virginia. One of his earlier jobs in sports was with WSB-TV in Atlanta, Georgia, where he covered the Braves and the Hawks and eventually became the night-time sports anchor.

Buckhantz currently resides in Washington, D.C. He married Shelley Lawrence on May 8, 2011. Shelley has two children from a previous marriage, Jake and Olivia Lawrence.  Buckhantz has spent 23 years as the Wizards' play-by-play announcer, alongside Phil Chenier and later, Kara Lawson, on NBC Sports Washington (formerly HTS from 1984-2001 and Comcast SportsNet from 2001-2017) until his departure after the 2018-19 NBA season.

Style
Buckhantz has garnered a reputation for his emphatic expressions, such as "Dagger", "Blocked by [player]!", "Backbreaker", "How good is he, Phil?", "How do you like that?", "Tough shot!", "It's good if it goes!....And it nearly did!", "Score the field goal, he'll go to the line!", "For the win!", "The refs have swallowed/put away their whistles!", "That's gotta be five seconds!", "That's hard to believe", "And [player/coach] is Livid!/Incensed", "Oh My!", "Follows it up twice!", “Foul, no call”, and "NO, it's not possible!"

His catchphrases have seeped into the lexicon of Washington, D.C. area sports fans, who revel in using them to describe a myriad of non-sports related events (ex. males observing a friend attempting to ask a woman for her phone number exclaim "Dagger!" or "Backbreaker!" when she can be seen rejecting the friend's advances) as well as debating the subtle and compelling distinction between a "Backbreaker" (a made basket at a critical juncture in a game that breaks any chance that the opposing team will win) and a "Dagger" (a made basket at a critical juncture in a game that stabs like a dagger at the opposing team's chance of victory).

30 for 30
In 2009, Buckhantz was featured in the ESPN 30 for 30 film Without Bias about the days leading up to the Len Bias death in the summer of 1986 after being chosen number 2 overall by the Boston Celtics after a stellar career at the University of Maryland. He was featured as a reporter for WTTG as the sports director at the time of Bias' death in 1986.

References

External links
Wizards Broadcasters:Steve Buckhantz www.nba.com
Steve Buckhantz:Commentaries on NBC Washington www.nbcwashington.com

1955 births
Living people
American television sports announcers
James Madison University alumni
Mid-Atlantic Sports Network
National Football League announcers
People from Arlington County, Virginia
Washington Wizards announcers